Lyndon, Pennsylvania is a very small unincorporated community located in West Lampeter Township in Lancaster County, Pennsylvania.  Lyndon is located just south of the city of Lancaster along U.S. Route 222.

References

Unincorporated communities in Lancaster County, Pennsylvania
Unincorporated communities in Pennsylvania